James Howell Nunnelee (January 26, 1858 - 1921) was a newspaper publisher and state senator in Alabama representing Dallas County, Alabama from 1899 to 1901. He was a Democrat.

He was born in Eutaw, Alabama and lived in Selma, Alabama. His father and brother were also in the newspaper business.  He married Emma Leonard. He also served as recording secretary to governors B. B. Comer and Emmet O'Neal.

References

19th-century American newspaper publishers (people)
People from Eutaw, Alabama
1858 births
1921 deaths
20th-century American newspaper publishers (people)
20th-century American politicians
19th-century American politicians
People from Selma, Alabama
Alabama Democrats